Rudo y Cursi (Spanish, literally, "Rough and Corny") is a 2008 Mexican comedy film starring Diego Luna, Gael García Bernal and Guillermo Francella. It is directed by Carlos Cuarón and produced by Cha Cha Cha Films. It is Carlos Cuarón's first full-length movie.

Synopsis 
In the fictional farming village of Tachatlán, in the Cihuatlán Valley of Jalisco, Mexico, young men dream of escaping the drudgery of the banana plantations. Two of them, a pair of half-brothers, play in local football matches. Tato is the star striker and Beto is the eccentric goalkeeper. During one match, they are spotted by a talent scout and he offers one of them the opportunity to go to Mexico City with him and try out for one of the country's big teams. As the scout's roster is already full, he says he can only take one of the brothers and they decide to settle it on a penalty shot. Tato scores the penalty against his brother, therefore earning the right to head to the capital.

Cast 
 Gael García Bernal as Tato "Cursi" Verdusco
 Diego Luna as Beto "Rudo" Verdusco
 Guillermo Francella as Darío "Batuta" Vidali
 Dolores Heredia as Elvira
 Joaquín Cosio as Arnulfo
 Adriana Paz as Toña

Production
Carlos Cuarón first formed the idea for the film while on a promotional tour for Y tu mamá también. He initially planned for only one character, but later decided to include a brother.

Principal photography began in summer 2007 in Cihuatlán, Mexico. The banana plantation where the brothers work in the film is actually owned by the Cuarón family. For his role Bernal wore blonde extensions to lengthen his hair while Luna dyed his hair black and grew a mustache to play the older brother. Additional filming took place in México City and Toluca.

Release
Rudo y Cursi released in December 2008 in Mexico. It premiered internationally at the April 2009 San Francisco International Film Festival and was screened at the 2009 Sundance Film Festival and the Tribeca Film Festival. It was released generally, on a limited basis, on May 8, 2009. It was released on DVD and Blu-ray Disc on August 25, 2009.

Box office
Rudo y Cursi was very successful at the box office. It became the sixth top grossing Mexican movie of all time. In its first two weeks in the US, it earned $738,706 on 219 screens. It eventually grossed $9,264,208 in overseas earnings, bringing its worldwide total to $11,091,868.

References

External links 
 
 Rudo y Cursi video, news and trailer at Biosstars International database
 
 
 

2008 films
2008 comedy-drama films
Association football films
Cha Cha Cha Films films
Films produced by Alfonso Cuarón
Films produced by Guillermo del Toro
Films directed by Carlos Cuarón
Mexican comedy-drama films
Sony Pictures Classics films
Focus Features films
Universal Pictures films
2000s Mexican films
2000s American films
American comedy-drama films